The Back Brook is a minor watercourse in the English counties of Shropshire and Staffordshire, in places forming the boundary between the two, and located generally to the east/southeast of the town of Newport. It flows into Aqualate Mere.

References

Rivers of Shropshire
Rivers of Staffordshire